Israel entered the Eurovision Song Contest 1993 with the song "Shiru" by Lehakat Shiru after they won the Israeli national final, Kdam Eurovision.

Before Eurovision

Kdam Eurovision 1993 
This Israeli broadcaster, IBA, held a national final to select the Israeli entry for the Eurovision Song Contest 1993, held in Millstreet, Ireland. The contest was held at the IBA TV Studios in Jerusalem, hosted by  co-Israeli representative Nathan Dattner. 12 songs competed, with the winner being decided through the votes of 7 regional juries.

The winner was Lehakat Shiru with the song "Shiru", composed by Shaike Paikov and Yoram Tahar-Lev.

Song

"Shiru" ("Sing") was performed in Hebrew and English by The Shiru Group on the night of the contest, one of two bilingual songs, along with the Croatian entry.

The song is about the power of song itself. The protagonist recalls how they were "given their songs" by the people they grew up with. They say song is "all we have" and they sing to "break walls" and "open hearts". The bridge of the song is performed in English, marking the second occasion, after its 1992 entry, on which the Israeli contest entry had featured any language apart from Hebrew.

At Eurovision
Lehakat Shiru performed 24th on the night of the final, preceding Norway. On stage, the members dressed in traditional Israeli dress, wearing red ribbons in solidarity with people living with HIV/AIDS.  Bracha, Haim, Nadler and Proiter were in the center of the stage, while Sharon was on piano and Zamir was backing singer. At the end of the song, they all joined in a row at the front of the stage. 

They received 4 points, placing 24th in a field of 25, Israel's worst ever finish in the grand final, and therefore were relegated from participating in the Eurovision Song Contest 1994.

Voting

References

External links
 Israeli National Final 1993

1993
Countries in the Eurovision Song Contest 1993
Eurovision